Jalouse is a 2017 French comedy film directed by David and Stéphane Foenkinos.

Plot
Almost overnight, Nathalie Pêcheux, a divorced French teacher, changes from a loving mother into a jealous monster. Her first target is her stunning 18-year-old daughter Mathilde, a ballet dancer, but her field of attack soon extends to her friends, colleagues, and even her neighbours. After the success of their film Delicacy, author and screenwriter David Foenkinos pairs up again with his brother Stéphane Foenkinos to portray a woman's radical and unexpected shift of character that oscillates between black comedy and psychological thriller.

Cast
 Karin Viard – Nathalie Pécheux
 Dara Tombroff – Mathilde Pécheux
 Anne Dorval – Sophie
 Thibault de Montalembert – Jean-Pierre
 Bruno Todeschini – Sébastien Corti
 Marie-Julie Baup – Isabelle
 Corentin Fila – Félix
 Anaïs Demoustier – Mélanie Pick
 Xavier De Guillebon – Thierry
 Eva Lallier – Emma
 Thérèse Roussel – Monique Mougins
 Sreypeich Bensimon – Lin

References

External links
 

StudioCanal films
2010s French-language films
French comedy films
2017 comedy films
2010s French films